Les Jeux des Jeunes Garçons ("Young Boys' Games") is the first book known to have rules relating to a game similar to baseball.  It was first published in 1815.

References

1815 non-fiction books
Baseball books
French books
1810s children's books